Sebastian Erl is a German singer originating from Berlin known by the artistic name Buddy. He is best known for his hit album "Ab in den Süden" in 2003.

Discography

Singles

References

External links
Official website

Living people
German male singers
Year of birth missing (living people)
Singers from Berlin